Crookesite is a selenide mineral composed of copper and selenium with variable thallium and silver.

Characteristics
It is formed by precipitation from hydrothermal fluids, and contains by mass: 16.3% Tl, 47.3% Cu, 2.9% Ag, and 33.6% Se.

Crookesite is an opaque, bluish grey to pink toned brown metallic mineral crystallizing in the tetragonal system. It has a Mohs hardness of 2.5 to 3 and a specific gravity of 6.9.

Name and discovery
It was discovered in 1866 in Skrikerum, Sweden and named for Sir William Crookes (1832–1919), the discoverer of the element thallium.

See also
 List of minerals
 List of minerals named after people

References

 
 

Silver minerals
Copper(I) minerals
Thallium minerals
Selenide minerals
Tetragonal minerals
Minerals in space group 82